The Zanvyl Krieger School of Arts & Sciences is an academic division of the Johns Hopkins University, a private research university in Baltimore, Maryland. The school is located on the university's Homewood campus. It is the core of Johns Hopkins, offering comprehensive undergraduate education and graduate training in the humanities, natural sciences, and social sciences.

History 
Johns Hopkins University, founded as the nation's first research university in 1876, originally hired "thirty of the profoundest scholars in the varied field of literature that can be secured, and which, with its magnificent  endowment, will undoubtedly become one of the leading institutions of learning in America". The current School of Arts and Sciences was formed when the Faculty of Philosophy merged with the Faculty of Engineering in 1967–1968.

In December 1992, Zanvyl Krieger, a 1928 alumnus, gave a $50 million challenge grant to the School of Arts and Sciences, "the largest monetary gift in the university's history and one of the largest in American higher education". The school was renamed for Krieger, who said "he chose to give the gift to the arts and sciences school because that was an area that philanthropists had neglected in recent years".

In November 2001, the school established two scholarships to honor six alumni killed in the September 11 terrorist attacks.

In November 2013, the university released its draft "Strategic Planning Final Report for the Krieger School of Arts and Sciences". Under the plan, fewer graduate students would be admitted (with enrollment cuts of 25% across departments), but graduate stipends were to be increased. In addition, more junior teaching faculty would replace retiring senior faculty.

Students objected in October 2016 when closure of the Humanities Center was under consideration. In January 2017, the school's dean assured them that the center would not close, but would be reorganized around one of three proposals: "...keeping the center’s name while rethinking its role in relation to other humanities departments; renaming the department as something that more 'clearly conveys its identity and focus'; or transforming the humanities center into a comparative literature department..."

October 2017 brought cancellation of the institution's Russian major, which was no longer compatible with the partner program in Russian at Goucher College. Russian courses continue to be taught, but a major in Russian is not available.

A university-wide promotion and tenure committee was established in 2020, to be piloted for three years and then evaluated.

Description 
Krieger School's educational offerings include over 60 undergraduate majors and minors and over 40 full-time and part-time graduate programs. Summer programs are available to high school students, visiting undergraduate students, and a post-baccalaureate pre-medical program.  Among these academic programs, the Krieger School's Biology, Creative Writing (Writing Seminars), Economics, English, German, History, History of Art, and Physics & Astronomy departments are among the top-ranked in the nation.

Faculty members are expected to spend as much time researching as teaching, and there are numerous research opportunities for both undergraduate and graduate students, ranging from the university-sponsored Woodrow Wilson Undergraduate Research Program to the nationwide Fulbright Hays Program for graduate students.  Recent enrollment figures available number that the Krieger School has 2,790 undergraduate students, 32 post-baccalaureate students, 924 full-time graduate students, and 1,379 part-time graduate students.

Academics

Humanities

Courses are offered in philosophy, classical Latin and Greek, history of art, creative writing, comparative literature, Near Eastern studies, film and media studies, and history of science and technology, as well as in the more familiar areas of English and American literature, history, and modern foreign languages. In February 2018, investor and alumnus Bill Miller donated $75 million to the philosophy department, to be used to increase the department's faculty and expand undergraduate and graduate programs.

Natural sciences

The departments of Biology, Biophysics, Chemistry, Cognitive Science, Earth and Planetary Sciences, Mathematics, and Physics and Astronomy offer programs leading to bachelor's degrees.

Social and behavioral sciences

There are a variety of programs available in anthropology, economics, geography, history, political science, psychology, and sociology. The departments are oriented toward research and the curricula are primarily designed to lead to graduate study.

Departments

The Krieger School contains many degree-granting departments, programs, and centers:

Notably, the French department was recognized as a "Center of Excellence" in the study of French culture and language by the government of France, one of only four in the United States. The Writing Seminars department, a program in creative writing, was ranked second-best in the nation by U.S. News & World Report.

Advanced academic programs
The Johns Hopkins University offers part-time graduate programs through the Advanced Academic Programs (AAP), a division of the Krieger School of Arts and Sciences centered in Washington, DC,

Research centers

References

External links
 Official website

Arts and Science
Educational institutions established in 1876
Liberal arts colleges at universities in the United States
1876 establishments in Maryland